The following is a list of characters that first appeared in the British soap opera Emmerdale in 1990, by order of first appearance. This year saw the introduction of a new family, the Feldmanns. Siblings Elsa and Michael debuted in February while their mother, Elizabeth appeared the following month. Councillor Charlie Aindow, in a new love interest for Dolly Skilbeck began appearing in August and Peter Whiteley, son of established characters Pete and Lynn was born in the same month.

Elsa Feldmann

Elsa Chappell (née Feldmann) first appeared in 1990 with her mother Elizabeth and brother Michael after they were being evicted from their house by Frank Tate. Elsa soon began dating Nick Bates and they got engaged and planned to marry on Valentine's Day 1991. However, Elsa was pregnant and gave birth to a daughter, Alice. As they were unable to get her to the hospital in time, Zoe Tate acted as midwife and helped deliver Alice. The couple separated, with Elsa leaving Nick on Christmas Day 1991, taking Alice with her. She soon realized that she wasn't ready for motherhood and Alice returned to Nick custody before Elsa left the village.

Following the death of her mother in the plane crash in December 1993, Elsa returned to Emmerdale for her funeral and tried to get custody by spreading rumours that Nick and his best friend, Archie Brooks, were gay. However, a court ruled in Nick's favour and Elsa left the village. After living in Australia for a while, Elsa returned in 1999 with a new husband, Brett, and stepson, Shane, hoping to take Alice to live with her in Australia. During Elsa's absence, Nick was imprisoned for manslaughter after killing a poacher and Alice went to live with his sister, Kathy Glover. Kathy, who was very close to her niece, let Elsa take Alice as she saw Alice wanted parents and a step brother, not an aunt. Kathy visited Elsa in 2001 and brought Alice home but Elsa followed and after seeing that Alice was happy with Kathy, suggested that Kathy join them to Australia with her and Alice. Kathy agreed and they returned to Australia.

Michael Feldmann

Michael Feldmann, played by Matthew Vaughan, first appears on 13 February 1990 when his younger sister, Elsa, introduces him to her friends Nick Bates, Mark Hughes and Rachel Hughes while on a night out at the Black Bull pub in Hotten. When Mark is bounced for being underage, the teens are cornered in the car park  by some bikers, who attack Mark and Nick, due to Nick insulting them earlier. Michael intervenes when the police arrive and Nick thanks Michael. Michael and Elsa, along with their mother, Elizabeth, are later evicted from their land on Blackthorn Farm by their landlord Frank Tate.

Michael seeks employment working for Annie and Jack Sugden and is later accused of arson, when one of the barns burns down, but is cleared - this is proven to be the work of a labourer from another estate.  Michael begins a relationship with Rachel. However, this was jeopardised after he had a one-night stand with Zoe Tate, who later comes out as a lesbian.

In 1992 Michael takes part in an armed robbery of Home Farm, which leaves Joe Sugden badly injured and fighting for his life. The robbery was organised by Neil Kincaid's stable hand, Steve Marshal. Following his mother Elizabeth's  marriage to Eric Pollard, several months later, Michael is arrested for his involvement in the attack, and consequently sentenced to four months imprisonment. Michael resents his mother's relationship with Eric and attacks him the Woolpack, punching him. When Elizabeth is killed, in the Emmerdale plane crash of 1993, Michael accuses Eric of murder. It transpires that Elizabeth had uncovered evidence of Eric committing cheque fraud, for which he had framed Michael, and was about to report him to the police when she was killed by falling plane debris. Eric is then suspected of murdering Elizabeth and things are not helped when Eric's first wife, Eileen Pollock, arrives and claims that Eric and Elizabeth's marriage was bigamous. This leads to a fight between Michael and Eric, which sees Eric pinning Michael to the floor. Elsa arrives and Michael takes advantage of the distraction to shove Eric, who hits head on the coffee table. Elsa, believing that Michael has killed Eric, tells Michael to run and he flees in Eric's car, which he later abandons at an airport.

In 2010 Eric begins receiving letters, messages and cards, claiming to be from Elizabeth. Originally suspecting the messages to be sent by Amy Wyatt, it is on 30 December, 17 years to the day of the plane crash, that the messages are instead found to be from  Michael. Michael, who has been in-and-out of jail, confronts Eric at Elizabeth's grave. He later follows Eric back to The Grange, where he again confronts him, prompting him to reveal his history to his current wife, Val. Michael then leaves. However, he later informs Amy that he wants Eric to pay him a large sum or money, otherwise he will reveal Eric to be a murderer. Eric tells Michael to come in his car with him, and he will pay him off. Eric drives Michael to a remote area, however, and, after an exchange of words, Eric produces a tyre iron, advancing on Michael, who cowers into a corner. The result of the incident was not revealed. Eric returns to Emmerdale alone, appearing at edge and nervous, telling Val that he had given Michael a lift to the station. 

Michael reappears on 4 January to confront Eric, who refuses to give him any more money. After 17 years, Eric finally reveals what happened - that he had considered killing Elizabeth that night, but that she had been killed in the plane crash first. Val supports her husband, obtaining a copy of the coroner's report, which confirms Elizabeth was killed by falling debris. Val tells Michael it is time he stopped blaming Eric. After a calm discussion, Michael agrees to leave and Eric gives him some money in order to look after himself and Michael drives out of the village into the night.

Elizabeth Feldmann

Elizabeth Pollard (previously Feldmann), played by Kate Dove, arrived in the village with her son Michael and daughter Elsa in 1990. She found herself fighting between the affections of Alan Turner and Eric Pollard. Elizabeth chose Eric and married him in October 1992; she was unaware that Eric was still legally married to his first wife Eileen and was committing bigamy.

Eventually, Elizabeth discovered that Eric had planted a typewriter on her son, Michael, in order to disguise the fact that he himself had committed cheque fraud and was prepared to let Michael take the blame. On 30 December 1993, Elizabeth left Eric, informing him that she would report him to the police. He tried to dissuade her, saying that if she reported him, she herself would face prosecution for her role in the theft of antique vases, however, Elizabeth admitted that her own imprisonment would be worth that of Eric's. Shortly afterwards, Elizabeth was killed in the plane crash that struck the village. Her son, Michael, however, as well as a majority of villagers, believed that Eric had actually murdered her in order to stop her from exposing his fraudulent activities.

Nearly seventeen years after her death, in December 2010, Eric started to receive notes, messages and Christmas greetings, signed from Elizabeth. Originally believing them to be from Amy Wyatt (Chelsea Halfpenny), it later transpired that Elizabeth's son Michael had been sending the notes and returned to the village after 16 years of absence, in order to make Eric pay for the murder of his mother. Eric told Val on 3 January 2011 about the night of the plane crash 17 years before and stated the events leading up to her death such as about the cheque fraud and stolen Roman bracelet. He then stated that he went round to see her then after a brief row she had stormed out of the house and he followed her, caught up with her and tried to get her to listen and that she had run off into the night screaming but a tree near her burst into flames as plane wreckage shot down and the sky lit up. Eric explains that he went back a bit later and found her dead. On 4 January 2011, Eric's current wife Val Pollard (Charlie Hardwick) obtained the coroners report into Elizabeth's death which confirmed she had been killed by falling debris from the plane.

In May 2011, Eric mentioned her when he and David were looking for Amy in Hotten, and she is mentioned once again in July 2015 when Val, facing prison for committing fraud against the Bank, reminds Eric (who is upset over her actions) that he once tried to "defraud his dead ex-wife", referring to Elizabeth. In October 2015, Lawrence White (John Bowe) threatens Eric with legal action over his past if he gives evidence against Chrissie Sugden (Louise Marwood) in court. Lawrence tells Eric that he will get his lawyers to dig up dirt on his past, including "an ex-wife who died in mysterious circumstances" before saying "What was her name, Elizabeth?" His threat leads to Eric not giving evidence against Chrissie in court, suggesting that he may have had a more guilty role in Elizabeth's death than stated back in 2011.

Charlie Aindow

Charlie Aindow, played by David Fleeshman, first appeared in the village in 1990. Charlie was a councillor but was not all he seemed. The truth was that he was corrupt and quickly got involved in dodgy schemes with local villain Eric Pollard.

Shortly after arriving, Charlie falls for feisty barmaid Dolly Acaster, whose ex-husband Matt Skilbeck has just left the village, leaving her depressed. After initial bonding, Charlie and Dolly begin an affair which carries on until the revelation that Dolly is pregnant brings him back to reality. Not wanting to be a father, Charlie advises Dolly to get an abortion, which she does. Despite this, he is devastated when she leaves the village in Autumn 1991 to reunite with Matt in Norfolk. Realising what he has lost and not popular amongst the villagers, Charlie leaves Beckindale in 1992.

Peter Whiteley

Peter Whiteley was the son of Pete and Lynn Whiteley and appeared from 1990 to 1994 during the first four years of his life. He was born on the same day of the funeral of his father, Pete, who had been run over and killed by his lover's mother Kate Sugden. Lynn began to raise Peter as a single mother. On the night of the plane crash, Lynn left Peter with a babysitter whilst she went to The Woolpack and Whiteley's Farm was hit by falling debris from the plame and set on fire. The babysitter managed to get out of the house and save Peter and he was later reunited with his mother, although their home was destroyed. Peter left the village with his mother to live with her new lover, Sven Olsen, in Australia in August 1994.

Others

References

1990
, Emmerdale